Simaria is a community development block that forms an administrative division in the Simaria subdivision of the Chatra district, Jharkhand state, India.

Overview
Chatra district forms a part of the Upper Hazaribagh Plateau, Lower Hazaribagh Plateau and northern scarp. Red laterite acidic soil predominates in an area that is primarily dependent upon rain-fed agriculture. Around 60% of the district is covered with forests. The district has a population density of 275 persons per km2. Around two-thirds of the families in the district live below poverty line. In the extreme south of the district some portions of Tandwa CD Block are part of North Karanpura Coalfield.

Maoist activities
Jharkhand is one of the states affected by Maoist activities. , Chatra was one of the 14 highly affected districts in the state. 5 persons were killed in Chatra district in 2012, but Maoist activities, such as arms training camps and organisation of ‘Jan Adalats’ (kangaroo courts) were on the decline.

, Chatra was identified as one of the 13 focus areas by the state police to check Maoist activities.

Geography

Simaria CD block is bounded by Chatra and Pathalgada CD blocks in the north, Katkamdag and Barkagaon CD blocks, in Hazaribagh district, in the east, Keredari CD block in Hazaribagh district, Tandwa CD block, and Bariyatu CD block in Latehar district, in the south and Lawalong CD block in the west.

Simaria CD block has an area of 512.48 km2.Simaria police station serves this block. The headquarters of Simaria CD block is at Simaria village.

There are 17 panchayats and 100 villages in Simaria CD block.

Gram panchayats of Simaria CD block/ panchayat samiti are: Chope, Pundra, Pagar, Sabano, Bagra, Srendag, Kasari, Jabra, Jirwa Khurd, Banasadi, Edla, Piri, Dadi, Ichak, Hurnali, Jangi and Banhe.

Demographics

Population
According to the 2011 Census of India, Simaria CD block had a total population of 107,871, all of which were rural. There were 54,855 (51%) males and 53,016 (49%) females. Population in the age range 0–6 years was 19,129. Scheduled Castes numbered 32,496 (30.12%) and Scheduled Tribes numbered 8,761 (8.12%).

Simaria Khurd had a population of 1,055 and Simaria Kalan had a population of 2,412 in 2011.

Literacy
As per the 2011 census, the total number of literate persons in Simaria CD block was 56,262 (63.40% of the population over 6 years) out of which males numbered 32,846 (72.63% of the male population over 6 years) and females numbered 23,416 (44.18% of the female population over 6 years). The gender disparity (the difference between female and male literacy rates) was 28.45%.

As per the 2011 census, literacy in Chatra district was 60.18%  Literacy in Jharkhand (for population over 7 years) was 66.41% in 2011. Literacy in India in 2011 was 74.04%.

See also – List of Jharkhand districts ranked by literacy rate

Language and religion
According to the District Census Handbook, Chatra, 2011 census, as of 2001, among the different mother tongues (languages mentioned under 8th Schedule of Constitution of India), Hindi was spoken by 703,337 persons forming 88.87% of the population of Chatra district, followed by Urdu  68,301 persons (8.63%), Oraon 11,115 persons (1.40%) and other languages (with no details) 8,681 (1.10%). The population of the Scheduled Tribes in the district of Chatra during 2011 Census was 45,563 constituting 4.36 percent of the total population of the district.

Hindi is the official language in Jharkhand and Urdu has been declared as an additional official language.

According to the District Census Handbook, Chatra, 2011 census, Hindus numbered 903,179 and formed 86.60% of the population of Chatra district, followed by Muslims 116,710 (11.19%).

Rural poverty
Total number of BPL households in Simaria CD block in 2002-2007 was 13,863. According to 2011 census, number of households in Simaria CD block was 19,556. Rural poverty in Jharkhand declined from 66% in 1993–94 to 46% in 2004–05. In 2011, it has come down to 39.1%.

Economy

Livelihood

In Simaria CD block in 2011, among the class of total workers, cultivators numbered 17,974 and formed 38.33%, agricultural labourers numbered 21,391 and formed 45.62%, household industry workers numbered 1,339 and formed 2.86% and other workers numbered 6,183 and formed 13.19%. Total workers numbered 46,887 and formed 43.47% of the total population, and non-workers numbered 60,984 and formed 56.53% of the population.

Infrastructure
There are 95 inhabited villages in  Simaria CD block. In 2011, 16 villages had power supply. 2 villages had tap water (treated/ untreated), 94 villages had well water (covered/ uncovered), 95 villages had hand pumps, and all villages had drinking water facility. 8 villages had post offices, 8 villages had sub post offices, 6 villages had telephone (land line), 34 villages had mobile phone coverage. All villages had pucca (paved) village roads,  27 villages had bus service (public/ private), 14 villages had autos/ modified autos, 19 villages had taxi/vans and 59 villages had tractors. 3 villages had bank branches, 4 villages had agricultural credit societies, 1 village had cinema/ video hall, 1 village had public library and public reading room. 43 villages had public distribution system, 12 villages had weekly haat (market) and 44 villages had assembly polling stations.

Agriculture
Chatra is a predominantly forest district with 65% of the land area being covered with forests. The balance 35% of the area has both rocky and alluvial soil. Alluvial soil is found mostly near river valleys. Rice is the main crop of the district. Other important crops grown are bajra, maize and pulses (mainly arhar and gram).

Backward Regions Grant Fund
Chatra district is listed as a backward region and receives financial support from the Backward Regions Grant Fund.  The fund created by the Government of India is designed to redress regional imbalances in development. As of 2012, 272 districts across the country were listed under this scheme. The list includes 21 districts of Jharkhand.

Transport
NH 22 (old numbering NH 99) connects Sonbarsha (India-Nepal border) with Muzaffarpur, Patna, Gaya, Dobhi, Hunterganj and Chatra and terminates at its junction with NH 39 in Chandwa CD Block in Latehar district. NH 22 crosses NH 19 (old numbering NH 2) at Dobhi in Gaya district of Bihar.

Education
According to the District Census Handbook, Chatra, 2011 census, Simaria CD block had 36 villages with pre-primary schools, 93 villages with primary schools, 71 villages with middle schools, 12 villages with secondary schools, 2 villages with senior secondary schools, 2 villages with no educational facility.
.*Note: Senior secondary schools are also known as Inter colleges in Jharkhand

Simaria Degree Mahavidyalaya was established at Simaria in 2015. It is affiliated with the Vinoba Bhave University.

Healthcare
According to the District Census Handbook, Chatra, 2011 census, Simaria CD block had 11 villages with primary health centres, 16 villages with primary health subcentres, 14 villages with maternity and child welfare centres, 12 villages with allopathic hospital, 4 villages with dispensaries, 9 villages with veterinary hospitals, 7 villages with family welfare centres, 4 villages with medicine shops.
.*Note: Private medical practitioners, alternative medicine etc. not included

References

Community development blocks in Chatra district